Peter J. McDonough (August 24, 1925 – August 28, 1998) was an American Republican Party politician from New Jersey, who served in both houses of the New Jersey Legislature.

Biography
McDonough was born in Plainfield, where he was a lifelong resident. He attended Plainfield High School and St. Lawrence University. During World War II, he served in the United States Army Air Corps in the Pacific Theater and Japan.

He was a member of the Union County Board of Chosen Freeholders from 1960 to 1963. In 1963 he was first elected to the New Jersey General Assembly, where he served as the chairman of the Education Committee and the Transportation and Public Utilities Committee. He was a delegate to the 1966 New Jersey Constitutional Convention. In 1971 he was elected to the New Jersey Senate to represent the 22nd Legislative District and served as chairman of the Transportation Committee.

After his retirement from the Legislature, he founded the public affairs consulting firm, Peter J. McDonough and Associates. His son, Peter J. McDonough Jr., was the director of communications for Governor Christine Todd Whitman.

References

External links
Biographical information for Peter J. McDonough from The Political Graveyard
Our Campaigns – Senator Peter McDonough (NJ) profile

|-

|-

1925 births
1998 deaths
County commissioners in New Jersey
Republican Party New Jersey state senators
Plainfield High School (New Jersey) alumni
Politicians from Plainfield, New Jersey
St. Lawrence University alumni
Georgetown University Law Center alumni
United States Army Air Forces soldiers
United States Army personnel of World War II
Republican Party members of the New Jersey General Assembly
20th-century American politicians